Edward A. Kull (December 10, 1885 – December 22, 1946) was an American cinematographer and film director. He worked on more than 100 films between 1916 and 1946. He also directed 43 films between 1919 and 1938. He was born in Illinois and died in Hollywood, California.

Partial filmography

 The Mainspring (1916)
 The Social Buccaneer (1916)
 The Measure of a Man (1916)
 Her Soul's Inspiration (1917)
 Polly Redhead (1917)
 A Jewel in Pawn (1917)
 The Lair of the Wolf (1917)
 The Desire of the Moth (1917)
 The Charmer (1917)
 Come Through (1917)
 The Little Orphan (1917)
 The Kaiser, the Beast of Berlin (1918)
 Hungry Eyes (1918)
 Midnight Madness (1918)
 The Face in the Watch (1919) – directed
 The Pointing Finger (1919)
 The Sleeping Lion (1919)
 The Vanishing Dagger (1920) – directed
 The Diamond Queen (1921) – directed
 Terror Trail (1921) – directed
 The Man Trackers (1921) – directed
 Bulldog Courage (1922)
 With Stanley in Africa (1922) – directed
 Barriers of Folly (1922)
 Border Blackbirds (1927)
 The Apache Raider (1928)
 The Bronc Stomper (1928)
 Yellow Contraband (1928)
 Manhattan Knights (1928)
 Making the Varsity (1928)
 The Black Ace (1928)
 The Boss of Rustler's Roost (1928)
 .45 Calibre War (1929)
 King of the Wild (1931)
 Quick Trigger Lee (1931)
 Headin' for Trouble (1931)
 The Cyclone Kid (1931)
 Lariats and Six-Shooters (1931)
 Murder at Dawn (1932)
 The Savage Girl (1932)
 The Gambling Sex (1932)
 The Scarlet Brand (1932)
 45 Calibre Echo (1932)
 Tangled Fortunes (1932)
 Human Targets (1932)
 The Man from New Mexico (1932)
 The Penal Code (1932)
 Mark of the Spur (1932)
 High Gear (1933)
 War of the Range (1933)
Carnival Lady (1933)
 Marriage on Approval (1933)
 When Lightning Strikes (1934)
 The New Adventures of Tarzan (1935)
 Man's Best Friend (1935) – directed
 The Drag-Net (1936)
Tundra (1936)
 Law of the Wolf (1939)
 Port of Hate (1939)
 Riders of the Sage (1939)
 Fangs of the Wild (1939)
 Covered Wagon Trails (1940)
 Pioneer Days (1940)
 Wild Horse Valley (1940)
 Guns of the Law (1944)
 Harmony Trail (1944)
 Brand of the Devil (1944)
 Marked for Murder (1945)

References

External links

1885 births
1946 deaths
American cinematographers
American film directors
Burials at Forest Lawn Memorial Park (Glendale)